Jan Antoni Rzymełka (born 7 June 1952 in Katowice) is a Polish politician. He was elected to the Sejm on 25 September 2005, getting 8,878 votes in 31 Katowice district as a candidate from the Civic Platform list.

He was also a member of the Sejm 1989-1991 in the People's Republic of Poland, Sejm 1991-1993, Sejm 1997-2001, and Sejm 2001-2005.

See also
Members of Polish Sejm 2005-2007

External links
Jan Rzymełka - parliamentary page - includes declarations of interest, voting record, and transcripts of speeches.

1952 births
Living people
Members of the Polish Sejm 2005–2007
Members of the Polish Sejm 1991–1993
Members of the Polish Sejm 1997–2001
Members of the Polish Sejm 2001–2005
Civic Platform politicians
Members of the Polish Sejm 2007–2011
Members of the Polish Sejm 2011–2015